The Best Damn Fiddler from Calabogie to Kaladar is a 1968 National Film Board of Canada drama directed by Peter Pearson, produced by John Kemeny and written by Joan Finnigan. The 49-minute drama stars Chris Wiggins and Kate Reid, along with Margot Kidder in her first feature role.

Produced for the NFB's Challenge for Change program, the film had initially been "pushed aside and ignored by CBC TV," according to Canadian film scholar Gerald Pratley, who called it "A brilliant example of what our filmmakers could do if they had the opportunities and the material to replace the run-of-the-mill American films that dominate our theatres and television – the kind of inexpensive creativity private broadcasters continue to say they cannot afford."

Synopsis 
One of the best English-Canadian docudramas from the 1960s, The Best Damn Fiddler is a realistic account of an itinerant bush worker (Chris Wiggins) living in the rural area of the Ottawa Valley who can't make enough money to feed his large family but nevertheless rejects government handouts. The oldest daughter (Margot Kidder) eventually leaves home to find work and a better future.

Awards
 21st Canadian Film Awards, Toronto: Genie Award for Film of the Year, 1969
 21st Canadian Film Awards, Toronto: Genie Award for Best TV Drama, 1969
 21st Canadian Film Awards, Toronto: Genie Award for Best Direction, to Peter Pearson, 1969
 21st Canadian Film Awards, Toronto: Genie Award for Best Screenplay, to Joan Finnegan, 1969
 21st Canadian Film Awards, Toronto: Genie Award for Best Editing, to Michael McKennirey, 1969
 21st Canadian Film Awards, Toronto: Genie Award for Best Black and White Cinematography, to Tony Ianzelo, 1969
 21st Canadian Film Awards, Toronto: Genie Award for Best Art Direction, to Michael Milne, 1969
 21st Canadian Film Awards, Toronto: Genie Award Best Performance by a Lead Actor, to Chris Wiggins, 1969
 Melbourne International Film Festival, Melbourne: Diploma of Merit, 1970</ref>

Filming locations

 The farm locations, dance hall and river scenes were shot at Barryvale, Ontario.
 The downtown scenes were shot in Renfrew, Ontario.

References

Works cited

External links
 Watch The Best Damn Fiddler from Calabogie to Kaladar at NFB.ca
 

1968 films
Canadian drama films
English-language Canadian films
National Film Board of Canada films
Best Picture Genie and Canadian Screen Award winners
1968 drama films
Films produced by John Kemeny
1960s English-language films
Canadian black-and-white films
1960s Canadian films